The 1948 North Carolina Tar Heels football team represented the University of North Carolina during the 1948 college football season. The Tar Heels were led by sixth-year head coach Carl Snavely and played their home games at Kenan Memorial Stadium. The team finished the regular season undefeated with a record of 9–0–1, and outscored their opponents 261–94. North Carolina was ranked third in the final AP Poll of the season (conducted before bowl season), which is to date the highest finish in school history. They were invited to the 1949 Sugar Bowl, where they lost to Big 7 Conference champion Oklahoma.

Halfback Charlie Justice was a consensus first-team All-American, and finished second in the voting for the Heisman Trophy. He led the team in rushing, passing, and punting, with 766 rushing yards, 854 passing yards, and 20 total touchdowns. End Art Weiner was also named an All-American, including first-team by the Football Writers Association of America and the New York Sun.

Schedule

References

North Carolina
North Carolina Tar Heels football seasons
North Carolina Tar Heels football